WBNY is the college radio station of Buffalo State College, located within the city of Buffalo, New York. WBNY, licensed in 1982, broadcasts on 91.3 FM. The station is the descendant of BSC's AM carrier-current station known as WSCB, which could be received only on campus through the electrical system. The WBNY call letters were previously associated with 1400 AM in Buffalo in the 1940s and 1950s. The WBNY identification is apparently also used by a shortwave pirate radio station, unrelated to the FCC-licensed FM station.

WBNY maintains studio locations at Campbell Student Union 220 with transmitter facilities located on Porter Hall, with an effective radiated power of 1,000 watts (originally 100 watts, and 1,000 watts as of October 16, 2013), allowing not only for full campus-wide coverage, but also general coverage as far south as South Buffalo and as far west as Fort Erie, Ontario.

Music programs on WBNY include two and three hour blocks of RPM, punk rock, retro, folk/bluegrass, loud rock, jazz, American Roots, reggae, hip hop, and "format" shows, consisting of music from WBNY's library rotation.  Once a week, there is a six-hour block of talk radio, featuring shows and discussions about professional wrestling, politics, sports, and trivia.  The wrestling radio show "Monday Night Mayhem" originated on WBNY and after moving to an internet-only broadcast in December 2004, continued to be popular.

The station has been entirely student run since its inception in 1982. Carrier-current predecessor WSCB General Manager Michael Lesser and Program Director Scott Michaeloff were the directors of the WBNY effort, along with staff such as Tom Connolly. Lesser, who was also a VP of the Student Government, embraced the vision of Connolly and others, successfully petitioning the FCC and secured funding from the United Students Government (USG) to create WBNY. The DJ lounge, WBNY's "Lesser Lounge", was named in honor of the founding GM.

Lesser elected not to run for General Manager for a third term, and new GM Bob DeAmbra won election through popular vote. DeAmbra and Program Manager Tom Calderone nurtured an alternative format that became nationally recognized. DeAmbra's successor was Dave McKinley who was succeeded by Karen Szczuka, the first woman to become General Manager of WBNY. Szczuka had previously held the title of Underwriting Director. Szczuka went on to work for Archie Comic Publications, Inc. as an Executive Assistant to the Chairman in charge of International Publishing, Copyrighting, Head of Permissions to use the Archie likeness in print and media and wrote several free lance stories for Archie, Betty & Veronica, Betty and the Jughead comic book titles. Calderone became a Senior Executive at MTV. DeAmbra (American Express) and Lesser (Healthcare Marketing) went on to marketing careers. John Rosso became a senior executive with ABC, then Citadel and now Triton Digital. Engineer Nick Rozanov was General Manager, US of Radio 7 in Moscow, Russia and then moved into telecom. Scott Michaeloff is Senior Vice President and Executive Producer of Synaptic Digital. Many DJs, including Tom Connolly, Rick Walters and Dave McKinley, can be heard regularly on radio and TV in the Buffalo, New York area.

In the spirit of predecessor WSCB, local bands, regardless of status or talent, were invited to appear on programs like "Down at Lulu's." The station also began bringing in relatively unknown national acts like R.E.M., The Cure, and The Replacements, and then-breakout act The Smashing Pumpkins for local performances. Some WBNY staffers launched their own bands, among them Tina Peel's "Intergalactic Burnt Toast," Jeff Hastings' "The ShAnkHeAds," Kevin Walsh's "Leper Gumbies," and Jacob Frasier and Anthony Puglisi's "Animal Magnetism."

The WSCB callsign is now licensed to the FM station of Springfield College in Springfield, Massachusetts

Notable alumni
 David Blaustein - Entertainment Correspondent, ABC News Radio
 Howard Simon    - Sports Anchor WGR, Buffalo, New York
 Byron Brown - Mayor of Buffalo, New York
 Frank Stasio - Host, The State of Things, WUNC

References

External links
 WBNY Web site
 WBNY Alumni Organization
 WBNY Live WMA Stream
 WBNY MySpace Profile

BNY
BNY
Radio stations established in 1985
1985 establishments in New York (state)